Mallory O'Meara is an American non-fiction writer and podcaster.

Career 
O'Meara is the author of The Lady from the Black Lagoon (2019), which serves as a biography of make-up artist Milicent Patrick as well as a chronicle of O'Meara's search for information about Patrick.

The book includes evidence that Patrick designed the iconic Gill-man from Creature from the Black Lagoon, and that Bud Westmore, a member of the influential Westmore family of Hollywood make-up artists, worked to deny her credit for this achievement. The book was nominated for Hugo and Locus awards, and won the 2019 Rondo Hatton Classic Horror Award for Book of the Year.

O'Meara's second book, Girly Drinks, about the history of women making and drinking alcohol throughout the world, was published in 2021 by Hanover Square Press. Girly Drinks won a 2022 James Beard Foundation Award.

O'Meara's third book, Girls Make Movies: A Follow-Your-Own-Path Guide for Aspiring Young Filmmakers, is forthcoming from Running Press on May 23, 2023. Girls Make Movies is illustrated by comic book creator Jen Vaughn.

Since 2017 O'Meara has co-hosted Reading Glasses, a weekly podcast about reading and books, with filmmaker Brea Grant. Reading Glasses is part of the Maximum Fun network.

From 2013 to 2019, O'Meara also worked as a writer and producer for Dark Dunes Productions in Los Angeles.

Works 
 The Lady from the Black Lagoon  (2019, Hanover Square Press) 
 Girly Drinks: A Women's History of Drinking (2021, Hanover Square Press)
 Girls Make Movies: A Follow-Your-Own-Path Guide for Aspiring Young Filmmakers (2023, Running Press)

References

External links 
 
 Official website

21st-century American non-fiction writers
American women non-fiction writers
Living people
Year of birth missing (living people)
21st-century American women writers
American women podcasters
American podcasters